Pakistani cuisine (romanized: pākistānī pakwān) can be characterized by a blend of various regional cooking traditions from South Asia, Central and Western Asia, as well as elements from its Mughal legacy. The country's various cuisines are derived from its ethnic and cultural diversity.

Pakistani cuisine is based on Halal principles, which forbids pork and alcohol consumption in accordance with Sharia, the religious laws of Islam.

International cuisine and fast food are popular in major cities such as Islamabad and Karachi; blending local and foreign recipes (fusion food), such as Pakistani Chinese cuisine, is also common in large urban centres. As a result of lifestyle changes, ingredients such as masala (mixed and ready-to-use spices) and ghee (clarified butter) are becoming increasingly popular.

Historical influences

Pakistan's national cuisine directly inherits both Indo-Aryan and Iranic culture, coupled with Muslim culinary traditions. Evidence of controlled preparatory cuisine in the region can be traced back to as early as the Bronze Age with the Indus Valley Civilization. Around 3000 BCE, sesame, eggplant, and humped cattle were domesticated in the Indus Valley, and spices like turmeric, cardamom, black pepper and mustard were harvested in the region concurrently. For at least a thousand years, wheat and rice formed the basic foodstuff in the Indus Valley.

The arrival of Islam in South Asia through trade and intermittent conquests influenced the local cuisine of the region to a great degree; due to its Muslim-majority population, Pakistan's cuisine sees a strict observance of Islamic dietary laws. Most prominently, forbiddance on the consumption of pork and alcohol by Islamic regulation has shifted the focus of Pakistani cuisine to other types of meat, such as beef, lamb, chicken, and fish, alongside a variety of fruits, vegetables, and dairy.

Elements

Pakistani dishes are known for having aromatic and sometimes spicy flavours. Some dishes contain liberal amounts of oil, which contribute to a richer, fuller mouthfeel and flavour. Brown cardamom, green cardamom, cinnamon, cloves, nutmeg, mace, and black pepper are the most commonly used spices in the making of a wide variety of dishes throughout Pakistan. Cumin seeds, chili powder, turmeric, and bay leaves are also very popular. In the Punjab province, spice blends are characterized by their use of coriander powder. Garam masala (a mixture of aromatic spices) is a popular blend of spices used in several Pakistani dishes.

Regional cuisines

Balochistan 

Balochi cuisine is the food and cuisine of the Baloch people from the Balochistan region, comprising the Pakistani Balochistan province, the Sistan and Baluchestan Province in Iran and Balochistan, Afghanistan. Baloch food has a regional variance in contrast to the many cuisines of Pakistan and Iran. Among the most popular Balochi dishes are Balochi sajji (skewed lamb or chicken filled with rice), mutton rosh (mutton chops) and dampukht (meat slow-cooked in fats).

Khyber Pakhtunkhwa

Rice dishes and kebabs feature prominently in Pashtun cuisine. Lamb is eaten more often in Pashtun cuisine than any other Pakistani cuisines. Kabuli palaw, chapli kabab, tika, and mutton karahi are the most famous dishes. Historical variations include Peshawari cuisine. The Pashtun and Balochi cuisines are traditionally non-spicy.

Kalash 
Kalashi people have a rich food culture that includes various types of breads and cheese. The famous bread is made with flour and different types of nuts. Some breads are bilili (walnut bread), jã'u, (walnut bread), and kurau (flour kindled in crushed grape juice).

Punjab

Since Punjabi identity is considered geographical and cultural, almost all inhabitants of Punjab follow some variations within the cuisine, but on the other hand show many similarities together. This cuisine then falls into the broad category of Punjabi cuisine. Regional cuisine is mutual with some differences in many regions, including the South Punjab regions. Bong paye (made from legs and joints of cow, goat, buffalo or sheep), nihari (usually made from buffalo or veal shanks and bone marrow),biryani, murgh chanay or murgh cholay (chicken and chickpeas slow-cooked in butter) are considered authentic Punjabi specialties  in Pakistani cuisines.

South Punjab

Sindh

Sindhi cuisine refers to the native cuisine of the Sindhi people from Sindh, Pakistan. Sindhi Cuisine is considered to be very meaty (not many vegetarian dishes) and consists of a variety of chicken dishes. Karhi, daal pakwan, Palo fish and many other. They usually eat less spicy food.

Karachi

The cuisine of Karachi is mixture of all regions. However the same is heavily dominated by the Mughlai, Deccani and other cuisines of Muslims who migrated from present day India post partition of British India in 1947.

Gilgit-Baltistan 

Gilgiti cuisine is the cuisine of Gilgit-Baltistan, Pakistan. Prominent Gilgiti dishes, such as the Chapshoro have gained massive popularity among different parts of Pakistan. Mumtu, tiny dumplings are often served with yogurt and parsley and black pepper, vinegar, chili sauce.

Hunza

Meal structure

Pakistanis generally eat three meals a day, which are breakfast, lunch, and dinner. During the evening, many families have tea, which goes along with baked/fried snacks from a local bakery (or prepared at home). During the Islamic holy month of Ramadan, the eating patterns change to suhur, pronounced “Sehar” in Pakistan, and iftar. It is considered proper to eat only with the right hand as per Islamic tradition (also a tradition in many other Asian cultures). Many Pakistani families, particularly when guests are too many to fit at a table, eat sitting at a cloth known as Dastarkhān, which is spread out on the floor. In Pakistan, many street eateries serve food on a takht, in a style similar to what is seen in Afghanistan. A takht is a raised platform, where people eat their food sitting cross-legged, after taking tith sauce with a piece of baked bread (naan) or rice.

Breakfast

A typical Pakistani breakfast, locally called nāshtā, consists of eggs (boiled/scrambled/fried/omelette), a slice of loaf bread or roti, parathas, sheermal with tea or lassi, kulcha with chole, qeema (minced meat), fresh seasonal fruits (mangoes, apples, melons, bananas, etc.), milk, honey, butter, jam, shami kebab or nuts. Sometimes breakfast includes baked goods like bakarkhani and rusks. During holidays and weekends, halwa poori and chickpeas are sometimes eaten. In Punjab, sarson ka saag (mustard leaves) and maakai ki roti (cornbread) is a local favourite. Punjabi people also enjoy khatchauri, a savory pastry filled with cheese. Pakistan is not unlike many other Asian nations, in the sense that meat dishes are eaten as breakfast, especially on holidays. A traditional Sunday breakfast might be Siri-Payay (the head and feet of lamb or cow) or Nihari (a dish which is cooked overnight to get the meat extremely tender. The name "Nihari" comes from the Arabic word "Nahar", meaning "Day" or "Day break".) Many people used to eat "Bong" (Shank curry) in their Sunday brunch.

Lunch
A typical Pakistani lunch consists of meat curry or shorba (depending on the region) along with a carbohydrate such as rice or roti. Daal chawal is among the most commonly served dishes at lunch. Breads such as roti or naan are usually served for dinner, but have become more common during the day; rice may be served for dinner as well. Popular lunch dishes may include aloo gosht (meat and potato stew) or a vegetable and mutton salan (stew). Chicken dishes like chicken karahi are also popular. Alternatively, roadside food stalls often sell just lentils and tandoori rotis, or masala stews with chapatis. People who live near the main rivers also eat fish for lunch, which is sometimes cooked in the tandoori style.

Dinner

Dinner is considered the main meal of the day as the whole family gathers for the occasion. Food which requires more preparation and which is more savoury (such as biryani, nihari, pulao, kofte, kebabs, qeema, korma) are prepared. Lentils are also a dinnertime staple. These are served with a bread such as roti or naan or rice,  along with yogurt, pickle and salad. The dinner may sometimes be followed by fresh fruit, or on festive occasions, traditional desserts like kheer, gulab jamun, shahi tukray, gajraila, qulfi or ras malai.

Snacks and fast foods

Pakistani snacks comprise food items in Pakistan that are quick to prepare, spicy, usually fried, and eaten in the evening or morning with tea or with any one of the meals as a side dish. A given snack may be part of a local culture, and its preparation and popularity can vary from place to place. These snacks are often prepared and sold by hawkers on footpaths, railway stations and other such places, although they may also be served at restaurants. Some typical snacks are Dahi Bhala, Cutlass (Aloo tikki), chaat & Samosa Chaat, Bun kebab, Chana Masala, Chapli kebab, Shami kebab, Seekh Kebab, Malai Tikka Kebab (Meat and Yogurt), Reshami Kebab, Pakora, and Papar. Others include Katchauri, pakoras—either neem pakoras or besan (chickpea) Pakoras, Gol Gappay, Samosas—vegetable or beef, Bhail Puri, Daal Seu, Panipuri, and egg rolls. Nuts, such as pistachios and pine nuts, are also often eaten at home.

Main courses

In Pakistan, main courses are usually served with wheat bread (either roti or naan) or rice. Salad is generally taken as a side dish with the main course, rather than as an appetizer beforehand. Assorted fresh fruit or sometimes desserts are consumed at the end of a meal. Meat plays a much more dominant role in Pakistani food, compared to other South Asian cuisines. According to a 2003 report, an average Pakistani consumed three times more meat than an average Indian. Of all the meats, the most popular are goat, lamb and mutton, beef and chicken, which are particularly sought after as the meats of choice for kebab dishes or the classic beef shank dish nihari. Seafood is generally not consumed in large amounts, though it is very popular in the coastal areas of Sindh and the Makran coast of Balochistan and was a dominant element of the cuisine of the former East Pakistan (now Bangladesh).

Dishes, with or without meat, combined with local vegetables, such as bitter gourd, cauliflower, eggplant, okra, cabbage, potatoes, rutabaga, saag, and chili peppers are most common and cooked for everyday consumption. A typical example is aloo gosht (literally "potatoes and meat"), a homestyle recipe consisting of a spiced meat and potato stew, and is ubiquitously prepared in many households. Korma is a classic dish of Mughlai origin made of either chicken or mutton, typically eaten with naan or other bread, and is very popular in Pakistan.

Vegetable and legume dishes

There are plenty of vegetarian-friendly dishes which are popular in Pakistan. These are often cooked using traditional spices and flavoring agents such as chilies, turmeric, garlic, ginger, cumin, cloves, cinnamon, fennel seeds, etc. Vegetable and legume dishes are also very popular in Pakistan. Dishes such as Baingan bartha and Sarson da saag are typical examples eaten in most homes. Aloo mutter is made with potatoes and peas.

There are plenty of vegetables which are grown seasonally in Pakistan, which are cooked into tasty and spicy curries which are eaten for lunch or dinner. Some vegetable dishes, such as "aloo paratha" and "channa puri" are also consumed for breakfast.

Meat dishes
The meat dishes in Pakistan include bovine, ovine, poultry and seafood dishes. Chicken karahi is one of famous poultry dishes. The meat is usually cut in 3 cm cubes and cooked in a stew. The minced meat is used for Kebabs, Qeema, and other meat dishes. The meat dishes are also cooked with pulses, legumes and rice.

Barbecue and kebabs

Meat and grilled meat have played an important role in Pakistan for centuries. Kebabs are a staple item in Pakistani cuisine today, and one can find countless varieties of kebabs all over the country. Each region has its own varieties of kebabs, but some like the Seekh kebab, Chicken Tikka, and Shami kebab are especially popular throughout the country and in some other parts of South Asia.

Pulses
Various kinds of pulses or legumes, make up an important part of Pakistani cuisine. While lentils (called daal) and chickpeas (called channa/chanay ki daal) are popular ingredients in homestyle cooking, they are traditionally considered to be inexpensive food sources. Because of this reason, they are typically not served to guests who are invited for dinner or during special occasions. Combining meat with lentils and pulses, whether in simple preparations or in elaborate dishes such as haleem.

Beans such as black-eyed peas (lobia) and kidney beans (rajma) are sometimes served in a tomato-based masala sauce, especially in Punjab.

Chickpeas, red kidney beans, and other legumes are also popular in Pakistani cooking. They are usually cooked in a spicy gravy and served with rice or traditional flatbread (roti). Chickpeas, known as channa, are also a common breakfast food when served with puri. "Channa chaat" is another favorite street food and iftaar dish, which is made of chickpeas, chopped onions, tomatoes, and chilies, and seasoned with spices (chaat masala) and tamarind paste.

There are a wide variety of lentils, known as daal, that are consumed in Pakistan and frequently consumed with rice. "Daal chawaal" (lentils and rice) is known as a popular comfort food in many Pakistani households.

Rice dishes

Pakistan is a major exporter and consumer of rice. Basmati is the most popular type of rice consumed in Pakistan.

Dishes made with rice include many varieties of pulao:
 Maash pulao - A sweet and sour pulao baked with mung beans, apricots and bulgur (a kind of roughly milled cracked wheat). Exclusively vegetarian.
 Matar pulao - Pulao made with peas.
 Murgh pulao - Chicken and stock added. Creates a brown rice.
 Yakhni pulao - Meat and stock added. Creates a brown rice.
 Kabuli Palaw - is an Afghan dish, which is popular in Pashtun dominated regions in Pakistan such as the Tribal Areas, FATA, Khyber Pakhtunkhwa province in North-West Pakistan, and Balochistan in the South-West Pakistan. It is a variety of pilaf, consisting of steamed rice mixed with raisins, carrots, and lamb

Biryani is a very popular dish in Pakistan, and has many varieties, such as Lahori and Sindhi biryani. Tahiri, which is a vegetarian form of biryani, is also popular. All of the main dishes (except those made with rice) are eaten alongside bread. To eat, a small fragment of bread is torn off with the right hand and used to scoop and hold small portions of the main dish. Pickles made out of mangoes, carrots, lemon, etc. are also commonly used to further spice up the food.

In the Khyber-Pakhtunkhwa, feasts using mountains of spiced rice combined with pieces of slowly roasted lamb are often served for guests of honour. These kind of pulaos often contain dried fruit, nuts, and whole spices such as cloves, saffron and cardamom. Kabuli Palaw is very popular in Pashtun dominated regions in Western Pakistan. Such rice dishes have their origins in Central Asia and the Middle East.

Varieties of bread

Pakistanis eat breads made of wheat flour as a staple part of their daily diet. Pakistan has a wide variety of breads, often prepared in a traditional clay oven called a tandoor. The tandoori style of cooking is common throughout rural and urban Pakistan, and also has strong roots in neighboring India, Iran and Afghanistan. Some of these are:

 Chapati - Most common bread made in urban homes, where a tandoor is not available. Chapatis are cooked over a flat or slightly convex dark colored pan known as 'tava'. Chapatis are made of whole-wheat flour and are thin and unleavened. Tortillas are probably the most common analogous to chapatis, though chapatis are slightly thick. A variant, known as 'romali roti' (lit. Handkerchief bread), is very thin and very large in size.
 Kandahari Naan - Long, salty naan originating in Western Pakistan and commonly eaten with Peshawari Karahi or Chapli Kebab.
 Kulcha - This is a type of naan usually eaten with chickpeas and potatoes and mostly popular in urban centers of Punjab.
 Naan - In Urdu, the national language of Pakistan, the word Naan means bread. Unlike chapatis, naans are slightly thicker, typically leavened with yeast and mainly made with white flour. Some varieties like Roghani and Peshwari naan may also be sprinkled with sesame seeds. Naans are seldom, if ever, made at home since they require tandoor based cooking and require prep work. Numerous varieties of plain, as well as stuffed naans are available throughout Pakistan and each region or city can have their own specialty. Naan is a versatile bread and is eaten with almost anything. For instance, 'saada naan' or 'plain naan', is often served with Siri-Payay (cow's head and trotters) or Nihari (slow cooked beef stew) for breakfast in many parts of the country.
 Paratha - A flat, layered bread made with ghee or cooking oil and generally cooked on a 'tava'. However, a 'tandoor' based version is also common in rural areas. Parathas are very similar to pastry dough. Parathas most likely originated in the Punjab, where a heavy breakfast of parathas with freshly churned butter and buttermilk was commonly consumed by the farmers to prepare themselves for the hard day of work ahead. However, parathas are now a common breakfast element across the country. Along with the plain layered version, many stuffed versions, such as 'Aloo ka Paratha' (Potato stuffed paratha), 'Mooli ka Paratha' (Radish stuffed paratha), and 'Qeemah ka Paratha' (Ground meat stuffed paratha) are popular.
 Puri - This is a breakfast bread made of white flour and fried. Typically eaten with sweet semolina halwa or gravy (made out of chickpeas and potatoes). Puri is a fairly urban concept in Pakistan and puris are not part of rural cuisine anywhere in Pakistan. However, Halwa Puri has now become a favored weekend or holiday breakfast in urban Pakistan, where it is sometimes sold in shift carts or in specialty breakfast shops.
 Roghani Naan (lit. Buttered Naan) - It is a preferred variety of Naan sprinkled with white sesame seeds and cooked with a small amount of oil.
 Roti - This bread is extremely popular all over Pakistan. Tandoori rotis are baked in a clay oven, known as a tandoor, and are consumed with just about anything. In rural Pakistan, many houses have their own tandoors, while the ones without it use a communal one. In urban Pakistan, bread shops or "nanbai"/"tandoor" shops are fairly common and supply fresh, tandoor baked breads to household customers. 
 Sheermal – Saffron-flavored traditional flatbread. It is a festive bread prepared with milk ('sheer') and butter with added candied fruits. Sheermal is often a vital part of food served in marriages, along with taftan. It is often sweetened.
 Taftan - This is a leavened flour bread with saffron and a small amount of cardamom powder baked in a tandoor. The taftan made in Pakistan is slightly sweeter and richer than the one made in neighboring Iran.

Desserts

Popular desserts include Peshawari ice cream, sheer khurma, qulfi, falooda, kheer, Firni, zarda, shahi tukray and rabri. Sweetmeats are consumed on various festive occasions in Pakistan. Some of the most popular are gulab jamun, barfi, ras malai, kalakand, jalebi and panjiri. Pakistani desserts also include a long list of halvah, such as multani, hubshee, and sohan halvah.

Kheer made of roasted seviyaan (vermicelli) instead of rice is popular during Eid ul-Fitr. Gajraila is a sweet made from grated carrots, boiled in milk, sugar, cream and green cardamom, topped with nuts and dried fruit. It is popular in Pakistan, as well as in other parts of South Asia, including Afghanistan.

Tea varieties

Pakistanis drink a great deal of tea, which is locally called "chai." Both black (with milk) and green teas are popular and there are different varieties common in different parts of Pakistan. 

 In Gilgit-Baltistan and Chitral, as well as areas near the Chinese border, salty Tibetan-style butter tea is consumed.
 Doodh Pati Chai is made by cooking tea leaves with milk and sugar, sometimes served with cardamom for fragrance. Extremely sweet, this is a local variation of a builder's tea.
 "Kashmiri chai" or "noon chai", a pink, milky tea with pistachios and cardamom, is consumed primarily at special occasions, weddings, and during the winter, when it is sold in many kiosks.
 "Sabz chai" or "kahwah", a green tea often served after every meal in Kashmir, Khyber Pakhtunkhwa, and the Pashtun belt of Balochistan, served with saffron and nuts. 
 Sulaimani chai is black tea served with lemon.

Beverages
Besides tea, there are other drinks that may be included as part of the Pakistani cuisine. All of them are non-alcoholic as the consumption of alcohol is prohibited by Islam. During the 20th century, beverages such as coffee and soft drinks have also become popular in Pakistan. It is very common to have soft drinks nowadays with Pakistani meals.

 Almond sherbet - Sherbet made with almonds 
 Baraf Gola - Frozen Ice in a cup mould served with syrup as a topping
 Kashmiri chai/Gulabi chai - A milky tea known for its pink color, with an either sweet or salty taste
 Lassi - Milk with yogurt, with an either sweet or salty taste
 Lemonade (Limu pani)
 Qehwa - Green tea with cardamom
 Sardai - Mixture of different nuts and kishmish
 Sathu - Famous drink from Punjab
 Sherbet (syrup mixed in water)
 Sherbet-e-Sandal - Drink made with the essence of sandal wood
 Sikanjabeen - Lemonade (mint is also added)
 Sugarcane juice (Ganney ka ras)
 Thaadal - A sweet drink from Sindh

Halal

Observant Muslims follow the Islamic law that lists foods and drinks that are halal, permissible to consume. The criteria specify both what foods are allowed and how the food must be prepared. The foods addressed are mostly types of meat.

Foreign influences

In addition to the traditional food, fast food is also very famous across the country. In big cities, there is a presence of outlets of many International Fast Food Restaurants that includes KFC, McDonald's, Pizza Hut, Subway, Domino's, Burger King, Hardee's, Papa John's Pizza, Dunkin' Donuts, Baskin-Robbins and Taco Bell etc.

Occasionally, many people in Pakistan have dinner outside at a restaurant with foreign-influenced food, such as Western, Arab and Chinese dishes. Many westernized, Chinese restaurants and fast food outlets are dotted in all urban parts of Pakistan. The Punjab and Sindh provinces, where the majority of urban chains of many American, European and British restaurants have opened in many metropolitan cities, such as Karachi, Lahore, Faisalabad, Islamabad-Rawalpindi, Gujranwala, Peshawar, Multan, Hyderabad, Quetta, Sargodha, Bahawalpur, Sialkot, Sukkur, Larkana and many others. Marketing and advertisements have made these a haven for social and modern spots for all Pakistanis to try out.

Outside Pakistan, Pakistani cuisine is prevalent in countries, where there are large Pakistani communities present.

Pakistani food makes use of fresh hand-pounded masalas. Ghee is used, but the main component of the meal or a dish is meat (beef, lamb, chicken, goat, or fish), and vegetables are sparingly used. Surprisingly, Pakistani food also makes extensive use of olive oil. Sparingly used vegetables does not mean there is no vegetarian food on the menu. Since the cuisine is very similar to Punjabi-style of cooking, tikka, simmered dals, tawa sabzi, and chaat feature here.

See also

 Culture of Pakistan
 Biryani
 Food street
 List of Pakistani breads
 List of Pakistani condiments
 List of Pakistani soups and stews
 List of Pakistani spices
 Nihari Houses
 Pakistani pickle
 South Asian sweets
 Spices

References

External links

 

 
South Asian cuisine
Pakistani snack foods
Cui
Food watchlist articles